People's Square is a city square in Dalian, Liaoning province, China. 

It was initially built as the Dairen Tyouja Square by the occupying Japanese in 1914, changed to Dairen Government Square in 1945, renamed Dairen Stalin Square by the occupying Soviets in 1949, and finally renamed the People's Square in April 1999. It was the largest square in Dalian from 1914 to 1997, until the Xinghai Square was opened.

Buildings and structures in Dalian
Chinese architectural history
Tourism in China
Cultural heritage of China